The Wer'wolf MK2 is a Namibian designed and built military vehicle that offers protection against small arms fire and land mines.  The vehicle uses a MAN chassis, axles and engine. The Wer'Wolf MK2 is a modular vehicle. It is built with a crew compartment that seats three people plus a driver and a rear flatbed configuration. The flat bed configuration allows for different modules to be fitted. It is suited for rough terrain, in APC configuration the Wer'Wolf MK2 can carry up to 10 passengers plus the driver. Designed and built in 1998 it was the first Mine Protected Vehicle manufactured by Windhoeker Maschinenfabrik after it was bought by Government of Namibia.

Design
The Wer'wolf MK2 was developed by Windhoeker Maschinenfabrik, a subsidiary of August 26 Holdings which in turn is wholly owned by the Government of Namibia. The vehicle utilizes a MAN Truck & Bus AG chassis, axle and engine and is built for the African operating environment. The modular design of the vehicle allows for the rear flatbed to be interchangeable with different mounts such as a personnel compartment, a ZU-23-2 gun mount amongst others. As with other typical Southern African mine protected vehicles of its era it also has monocoque Cavalry designed to deflect a mine blast away from the occupants or cargo. The Wer'wolf MK2 is in service with the Namibia Defence Force (NDF).

The four-wheeled vehicle can carry up to 10 passengers in APC configuration, plus driver. The crew compartment has two roof hatches which allow a gunner to use the weapon mount. The passenger APC compartment has an additional three hatches. Two doors in the rear of the vehicle provide access for the passengers and crew.

Capabilities
The Wer'wolf MK2 features ballistic protection that can withstand impacts of up to 7.62×51mm NATO rounds. The Wer'wolf MK2 also provides protection against triple anti tank mines of up to  under any wheel and can also withstand a double anti tank mine explosion  under the hull. By adding an additional plate in the hull the vehicle can be protected against Explosively formed penetrator mines i.e.TMRP-6. The Wer'wolf MK2 provides side protection from IED explosion of 14 kg of TNT from a stand-off distance of 3 m.

Variants

Apart from the primary APC role, the vehicle was designed for use in other roles including:
 Ambulance
 Anti aircraft artillery role 
 Infantry fighting vehicle – an APC configuration armed with a 2A28 Grom 73mm gun
 VIP transport
 Freight logistics vehicle
 Multiple rocket launcher
 Recovery vehicle
 Water/Diesel tanker
 Riot control
 Communication vehicle

A variation of the Wolf MK2 called a HEC wolf has also been developed by WMF and Henrik Ehlers Consult (HEC).

Operators

  Fielded their units at exercise Amani Africa II in 2015.
  Some units were sold to the DRC army.
  It is the primary APC of the Namibian Army. The Namibian Police Force also operates units with the Special Field Force directorate.
  The United States Army Corps of Engineers had leased between three and nine units with Humanitarian Engineering Consulting CC (HEC) receiving commissioning fees in the deal. Thereafter they bought at least four units.
  Unknown number of units were sold to Swaziland.

Non-State Actors
  Used by German NGO Menschen gegen Minen (MgM).
 Peshmerga Images of some units operated by the Peshmerga were uploaded to the internet  
  Aegis Defense Services A British private military company was reported to have bought some units for use in Iraq.

See also
 Casspir
 Buffalo (mine protected vehicle)

References

Military trucks
Military vehicles introduced in the 1990s
Wheeled armoured personnel carriers